The Liberal Democratic Party of Bosnia and Herzegovina was a liberal party in Bosnia and Herzegovina.
On 1 December 2017 the party joined the Alliance of Liberals and Democrats for Europe Party as an affiliate.

During the 2018 Federation of Bosnia and Herzegovina general election, the LDS managed to only obtain 1,833 (0.11%) votes and no seats in the House of Representatives, but they did win 4 seats in the Assembly of Bosnian-Podrinje Canton Goražde and 6 in the Assembly of Canton 10. It is announced LDS will be merged into Our Party before general election 2022, in pre-election process.

What The Party Stands For:

For Democracy, Rule of Law, Human Rights, Tolerance, and Solidarity.
For a Just, Free, and Open Society.
For a Prosperous Bosnia and Herzegovina within a Prosperous Europe.
For Stable Development and Peace in the World.

Members of the Presidency of the LDP BiH
 Hasib Salkić – President

See also
Liberalism
Contributions to liberal theory
Liberalism worldwide
List of liberal parties
Liberal democracy

References

External links
Liberal Democratic Party official site
Young Liberals Bosnia and Herzegovina

Liberal parties in Bosnia and Herzegovina
Alliance of Liberals and Democrats for Europe Party member parties
Defunct liberal political parties